
Bellacher Weiher (also spelt Bellacherweiher, Bellacher-Weiher, or Weier) is a small lake at Bellach in the Canton of Solothurn, Switzerland. Its surface area is 3.3 ha. The pond was formed in 1548. Lake and surroundings are a nature preserve.

External links
http://www.bellacherweiher.ch 

Lakes of Switzerland
Lakes of the canton of Solothurn
1548 establishments in Europe
16th-century establishments in the Old Swiss Confederacy
LBellacherWeiher